Herk may refer to:

Given name
Herk Harvey (1924-1996), American actor
Herk Robinson (born 1941), American front office executive in Major League Baseball

Surname
Big Herk (born 1969), pseudonym of Amery Dennard, American rapper 
Isidore Herk (1882–1944), American burlesque manager

Places
Herk (river), a small river in Belgium, tributary of the Gete
Herk-de-Stad, a municipality in Limburg, Belgium

See also
Van Herk